Public Order (Badge of Honor) Russian Drama Theater is a theatre located in Cheboksary, Chuvashia, Russia.  It was founded on 14 December 1922.

History

In the summer of 1918 in the house of a merchant of Cheboksary, was organized a Russian drama group.  This group formed the basis of the troupe that opened the theatre in 1922.  On 14 December 1922 started the first theatrical season of the Russian Drama Theater with the representation of Vasilisa Melentyeva based on the play by Alexander Ostrovsky.  The first director of the theatre was I. A. Sloboda (Kukarnikov).  In 1935, the theatre was directed by E. A. Tokmakov.  From 1979 to 1989, as chief director worked M. Zilberman, then B. I. Nosovskiy, and now is Ashot Vaskonyan.

In 1952, for its 30th anniversary, and in 1972 for its 50th anniversary, the theatre was awarded by the Presidium of the Supreme Soviet of the Russian SFSR.  On 9 December 1982 the Presidium of the Supreme Soviet awarded the Order of the Badge of Honour to the Russian Drama Theatre for its services in developing the theatrical art.

References

External links
 (in Russian)

Buildings and structures in Chuvashia
Cheboksary
Theatres in Chuvashia
Objects of cultural heritage of Russia of regional significance
Cultural heritage monuments in Chuvashia